Shredder 1.0 is a work of Net Art created by Mark Napier. The Shredder 1.0 interface takes preexisting websites and deconstructs their code to create original abstract compositions.

Background
Mark Napier's Shredder 1.0 interface was first revealed in 1998. The Shredder 1.0 web interface was created to be both an interactive exhibit as well as an artwork generator. To create an image the user inserts a URL into the Shredder 1.0 and the code is then reinterpreted by a Perl Script code created by Napier. Perl programming language is a stable, open-source language and is the most popular web programming language due to its text manipulation capabilities and rapid development cycle.

In his piece summary Napier explains that in his view the web is not a physical representation of information in the same way a magazine or book is, but instead a temporary graphic created when browsing software interprets HTML instruction. The focus of Shredder 1.0 is to reveal this hidden truth behind the Internet and give the user a new interpretation of common web pages.

Influences and Technique
Though each website is different and will thus generate a different image, Napier's code is programmed to create aesthetically similar images. Although pieces of the original page often survive the shredding, such as images and some text, the new page closer resembles a non-representational painting. The signature color and shapes created by the Shredder 1.0 are largely due to Napier's background as an artist. Shredder 1.0 pieces have strong Abstract Expressionist roots, making use of Surrealist techniques in automatic art.

References

 .
.

Related Works
 Landfill (1998)
 Feed (2001)
 Waiting Room (2002)

External links
 https://wiki.brown.edu/confluence/display/MarkTribe/Mark+Napier
 http://www.perl.org/about.html
 http://www.potatoland.org/
 http://www.artchive.com/artchive/abex.html
Thomas Dreher: History of Computer Art, chap. VI.3.3 Browser Art  with a wider explanation of Mark Napier's "The Shredder" (1998).

Computer art
Internet culture